The Police Tactical Unit (PTU) is a unit within the Hong Kong Police Force which provides an immediate manpower reserve for use in large-scale emergencies. Unit companies are attached to all land Regions and are available for internal security, crowd control, anti-crime operations, disaster response and riot control throughout Hong Kong. The PTU is often referred as the 'Blue Berets', which is in reference to the blue berets worn as part of the uniform.

The PTU is also the parent organization of the Special Duties Unit (SDU), which specializes in counter-terrorism and hostage rescue, and the Special Tactical Contingent (STC), which specializes in riot control drawing members from other units including the PTU Headquarters and SDU for temporary ad hoc tasks.

The PTU base and training camp is located in Fanling.

History
The PTU was established in 1958, known then as the Police Tactical Contingent (PTC). The PTC's name changed to the PTU in 1968. In 1969, the PTU was allowed to wear the beret as their standard headgear, which lead to the unit being known locally as the "Blue Berets".

In 2009, the Saxon APC was replaced by Mercedes-Benz Unimog U500 APCs.

In May 2022, the PTU has acquired six Sabertooth APCs from Huakai Vehicles under the HK SAR government's 2020-2021 budget with HK$76.65 million (US$9.76 million) allocated for the purchase. The tender for the vehicles were completed in October 2021. The Sabertooths will replace the Unimogs in service due to export bans of anti-riot gear to the HKPF in 2019 and due to frequent deployments, which resulted in wear and tear.

According to a list of Refurbishment of Government Building projects released online by the Architectural Services Department, the PTU HQ's gymnasium, toilets and store room at Block M is proposed to be renovated for HK$5 to 10 million.

Duties
The PTU is responsible for training HKPF officers stationed within the Emergency Unit.

Organization
The PTU is made up of eleven companies, comprising in total about 2,000 officers. Each company (under the command of a Superintendent) is made up of 4 platoons, each led by an Inspector or Senior Inspector. A platoon comprises 32 Officers with 1 Station Sergeant (senior NCO) and 8 Sergeants.

The unit consists of the Training Division, Support Division, Research and Development Division, Emergency Unit, Special Tactical Contingent and the Special Duties Unit.

Equipment

Current

Firearms
 Smith & Wesson Model 10
 Remington 870
 Federal Model 201-Z Riot Gun
 AR-15

Gear
 S10 respirator

Vehicles
 Mercedes-Benz Sprinter
 Toyota Coaster
 Mutsubishi fuso rosa
 Mercedes-Benz atego
 Ford F550 armoured personnel carrier. Made in China and named Sabertooth

Former
 Mercedes-Benz Unimog U5000 armoured personnel carrier. Standard APC. Being phased out for the Sabertooth APC.
 Saxon (vehicle)
 Alvis Saracen
 Mercedes-Benz Vario
 Toyota dyna
 Isuzu NPR
 Bedford TJ

In Popular culture
 Tactical Unit (film series)
 On the First Beat

See also
List of police tactical units
Airport Security Unit (Hong Kong)
Beijing SWAT
Snow Leopard Commando Unit
Special Police Unit

References

Hong Kong Police Force
1958 establishments in Hong Kong